Begley is an anglicized Irish surname, derived from the Irish Ó Beaglaoich, and may refer to:

 Adam Begley (born 1959), American author (son of Louis Begley)
 Andrea Begley, Northern Irish singer, winner of The Voice UK
 Colm Begley (born 1986), Irish Gaelic footballer and Australian rules footballer
 Paul Begley, a Gaelic football player from Laois in Ireland
 Ed Begley (1901–1970), American film actor
 Ed Begley Jr. (born 1949), American film actor (son of veteran character actor Ed Begley) and environmentalist 
 Louis Begley (born 1933), American lawyer and novelist
 Michael Begley (disambiguation), several people
 Owen M. Begley (1906–1981), New York politician
 Sharon Begley, American science journalist at Newsweek
 Thomas Begley (1970–1993), Provisional Irish Republican Army volunteer killed in the Shankill Road Bombing in West Belfast 
 Tadhg Begley, American chemist

English-language surnames